Dypsis lutescens, also known as golden cane palm, areca palm, yellow palm, butterfly palm, or bamboo palm, is a species of flowering plant in the family Arecaceae, native to Madagascar and naturalized in the Andaman Islands, Réunion, El Salvador, Cuba, Puerto Rico, the Canary Islands, southern Florida, Haiti, the Dominican Republic, Jamaica, the Leeward Islands and the Leeward Antilles.

Phonetic spelling: DIP-sis loo-TESS-enz

Description
Dypsis lutescens is a perennial tropical plant that grows  in height and spreads from 3-5 m (8-15ft). Multiple cane-like stems emerge from the base, creating a vase-like shape. Petioles are yellow-green, waxy, with a maculate base. The leaves have 40-60 pairs of leaflets. Leaflet arrangement is opposite and shape is linear to lanceolate. It bears 2ft long panicles of yellow flowers in summer. Offsets can be cut off when mature enough, as a propagation method. It bears oblong fruit that is 0.5 in long which ripens from yellow/gold to dark purple/black.  

It is grown as an ornamental plant in gardens in tropical and subtropical regions, and elsewhere indoors as a houseplant. It has gained the Royal Horticultural Society's Award of Garden Merit.

One of several common names, "butterfly palm", refers to the leaves which curve upwards in multiple stems to create a butterfly look.

In its introduced range, this plant acts as a supplier of fruit to some bird species which feed on it opportunistically, such as Pitangus sulphuratus, Coereba flaveola and Thraupis sayaca species in Brazil.

Cultural Requirements 
In it's native habitat, Dypsis lutescens grows in moist forested areas in Madagascar. It grows best in rich, moist, and well-drained soils and in bright, partly shaded areas. It will tolerate full sun, but long periods of direct sunlight may burn the foliage. Overfertilization will result in yellowing of the leaves. It is a low maintenance tropical plant.

It is winter hardy to USDA zones 10-11, and does well outdoors in warm climates with medium to high humidity. The plant is highly sensitive to cold temperatures.

Pest & Diseases 
Dypsis lutescens has no serious insect or disease problems. They are susceptible to scale, whiteflies, and spider mites. Plants grown outdoors may be subject to phytoplasma disease of palms which is spread by planthoppers and can cause severe yellowing.

Uses 
In the native climate, the plant may be massed and used as a landscape specimen, privacy screen, or informal hedge.

In temperate climates, it is a very popular houseplant. It is known to reduce indoor air pollutants and help in air purification.  It may also be used in outdoor ornamental displays in the summer months.

Gallery

References

External links

PACSOA: Dypsis lutescens
Part of this article was compiled from the Portuguese Wikipedia article.

lutescens
Endemic flora of Madagascar
Plants described in 1878
Taxa named by Hermann Wendland